Andy Cameron may refer to:

Andy Cameron (interactive artist) (1959–2012), British founder of art collective group Antirom
Andy Cameron (comedian) (born 1940), Scottish comedian and broadcaster

See also 
Andrew Cameron (disambiguation)